Xanthorrhoea is a genus of about 30 species of flowering plants endemic to Australia. Species are known by the name grass tree.

Description

All are perennials and have a secondary thickening meristem in the stem. Many, but not all, species develop an above ground stem. The stem may take up to twenty years to emerge. Plants begin as a crown of rigid grass-like leaves, the caudex slowly growing beneath. The main stem or branches continue to develop beneath the crown, This is rough-surfaced, built from accumulated leaf-bases around the secondarily thickened trunk. The trunk is sometimes unbranched, some species will branch if the growing point is damaged, and others naturally grow numerous branches.

Flowers are borne on a long spike above a bare section called a scape; the total length can be over three four metres long in some species. Flowering occurs in a distinct flowering period, which varies for each species, and often stimulated by bushfire. Fires will burn the leaves and blacken the trunk, but the tree survives as the dead leaves around the stem serve as insulation against the heat of a wildfire.

The rate of growth of Xanthorrhoea is slow. Although some species  grow slowly (0.8–6 cm in height per year),but increase their rate of growth in response to season and rainfall.
After the initial establishment phase, the rate of growth varies widely from species to species. Thus, while a five-metre-tall member of the fastest-growing Xanthorrhoea may be 200 years old, a member of a more slowly growing species of equal height may have aged to 600 years.

Taxonomy 
Xanthorrhoea is allied to the family Asphodelaceae as monotypic subfamily Xanthorrhoeoideae. The Xanthorrhoeoideae are monocots, part of order Asparagales.

A reference to its yellow resin, Xanthorrhoea literally means "yellow flow" in Ancient Greek.
The invalid Acoroides (‘Acorus-like’) was a temporary designation in Solander's manuscript from his voyage with Cook, originally not meant for publication.

Common names for Xanthorrhoea include grasstree, grass gum-tree (for its resin-yielding species), kangaroo tail and blackboy. The Aboriginal people called the plants Balga because after a bush fire had ravaged the land, the blackened trunk of the Xanthorrhoea would be revealed beneath the burned lower leaves, and would resemble a child like black figure. Others believe that the plant, with its bush fire blackened trunk and long flower spike resembled an Aboriginal boy wielding a spear.

In the South West, the Noongar name balga is used for X. preissii.  In South Australia, Xanthorrhoea is commonly known as yakka''', also spelled yacca and yacka, a name probably from a South Australian Aboriginal language, mostly likely Kaurna.

The name grasstree is applied to many other plants.Kingia and Dasypogon are unrelated Australian plants with a similar growth habit to Xanthorrhoea. Both genera have at times been confused with xanthorrhoeas and misnamed as "grasstrees".  Some plant classification systems such as Cronquist have included a wide range of other genera in the same family as Xanthorrhoea.  However, later anatomical and phylogenetic research has supported the view of Dahlgren who regarded Xanthorrhoea as the sole member of his family Xanthorrhoeaceae sensu stricto, which is now treated as the subfamily Xanthorrhoeoideae.

 Diversity and distribution 

A genus endemic to Australia, occurring in all national states and territories. Some species have a restricted range, others are widely distributed.
According to the World Checklist of Selected Plant Families,  the following species are accepted:

Habitat
Grasstrees grow in coastal heaths, and wet and dry forests of Australia. They are drought and frost tolerant. The grass tree mainly occurs in soils that are very free draining and consequently low in nutrients. It survives in the poorest soils, with a shallow root system, enabling it easily access nutrients from decaying litter, while storing all the food reserves in its stem.

Ecology
The grass tree has developed adaptations that help it better suit the environment where it occurs. If a fire breaks out, the grass tree has a special physiological adaptation called thermal insulation that helps protect the plant. The grass tree holds its thick, dead leaves around its stem which serves as insulation, and helps to protect the plant against the heat of the fire.

They need fire to clear away dead leaves and promote flowering, as these slow-growing trees were among the first flowering plants to evolve.
Grass trees have developed a structural adaptation which helps the grass tree take advantage of soil fertilized with ash after fire, producing a flowering stalk in the aftermath.

The grass tree forms a mycorrhizal relationship with fungi deep in its root system, wherein fungi live in a mutually beneficial relationship with the grass tree roots. The fungus increases the tree root's access to water and nutrients and therefore increases tree growth especially in poor conditions. The grass tree also suffers from a condition known as phytophthora dieback. Phytophthora cinnamomi is a discrete soil borne pathogen that attacks and destroys vascular root systems, causing hosts to perish through lack of nutrients and water. It is spread through infected plants and the movement of contaminated soil and gravel.

CultivationXanthorrhoea may be cultivated, as seed is easily collected and germinated. While they do grow slowly, quite attractive plants with short trunks (10 cm) and leaf crowns up to 1.5 m (to the top of the leaves) can be achieved in 10 years. The slow growth rate means that it can take 30 years to achieve a specimen with a significant trunk. Most Xanthorrhoea sold in nurseries are established plants taken from bushland. Nurseries charge high prices for the plants. However, there is a very low survival rate for nursery-purchased plants (mainly due to over watering),  which may take several years to die. The most successful examples of transplanting have been where a substantial amount of soil, greater than one cubic metre, has been taken with the plants.

The genus Xanthorrhoea, more commonly known as the grass tree, is an iconic plant that epitomizes the Australian bush in its ability to live in poor nutrient soils and respond to wildfire.

Commonly grown species for the garden include Xanthorrhoea australis, X. malacophylla and X. preissii.

 Uses Xanthorrhoea is important to the Aboriginal peoples. It is a highly valued resource with many uses. The flowering spike may be utilised as the lightweight handle of a composite spear with a hardwood sharp shaft inserted into the end. It is also soaked in water and the nectar from the flowers gives a sweet-tasting drink. 
In the bush the flowers could reveal directions, since flowers on the warmer, sunnier side – usually north – of the spike often open before the flowers on the cooler side facing away from the sun.

The resin from Xanthorrhoea plants is used in spear-making and is an invaluable adhesive for Aboriginal people, often used to patch up leaky coolamons (water containers) and even yidaki (didgeridoos). The dried flower stalk scape was also used to generate fire by the hand drill friction method.

Resin collected from the plant was used in Australia until the mid-twentieth century for the following purposes:
Burnt as an incense in churches.
A base component for a varnish used on furniture and in dwellings.
A polish and a coating used on metal surfaces including stoves, tin cans used for storing meat and “brass instruments.”
A component used in industrial processes associated with “sizing paper, in soap making, perfumery and in manufacturing early gramophone records.”

 Gallery 

References

External links

 Xanthorrhoea australis - R.Br. Plants For A Future
 Xanthorrhoea Information Page Monica Pawlan
 
 Xanthorrhoea, Australian Plant Name Index (APNI)
 
Bush Heritage Australia(2016). Grass Trees. Retrieved from http://www.bushheritage.org.au/species/grass-trees
Parks Victoria. Grass Trees: Xanthorrhoea australis Xanthorrhoea minor''

Asparagales of Australia
Australian Aboriginal bushcraft
Bushfood
Asphodelaceae genera